Sergej Pfeifer (born 20 February 1977) is a German gymnast. He competed at the 2000 Summer Olympics and the 2004 Summer Olympics.

References

External links
 

1977 births
Living people
German male artistic gymnasts
Olympic gymnasts of Germany
Gymnasts at the 2000 Summer Olympics
Gymnasts at the 2004 Summer Olympics
Sportspeople from Dushanbe